Maerua juncea, commonly known as the rough-skinned bush cherry, is a plant species in the  Capparaceae family. It is native to the Afrotropics.

Subspecies
The following subspecies are accepted:

 M. j. subsp. crustata Wild
 M. j. subsp. juncea

References

juncea